Peter Ivars is a Finnish orienteering competitor. He received a bronze medal in the relay event at the 1989 World Orienteering Championships in Skövde, together with Keijo Parkkinen, Ari Kattainen and Reijo Mattinen.

See also
 List of orienteers
 List of orienteering events

References

Year of birth missing (living people)
Living people
Finnish orienteers
Male orienteers
Foot orienteers
World Orienteering Championships medalists